The Pelegrín System (Spanish: El sistema Pelegrín) is a 1952 Spanish sports comedy film directed by Ignacio F. Iquino and starring Fernando Fernán Gómez, Isabel de Castro and Sergio Orta.

Cast

References

Bibliography 
 Bentley, Bernard. A Companion to Spanish Cinema. Boydell & Brewer 2008.

External links 
 

1950s sports comedy films
Spanish association football films
1952 films
1950s Spanish-language films
Films directed by Ignacio F. Iquino
Films produced by Ignacio F. Iquino
Spanish sports comedy films
1952 comedy films
Spanish black-and-white films
Films scored by Augusto Algueró
1950s Spanish films